Helene Amalie Krupp (1732–1812) was a German industrialist.

She was married to Friedrich Jodocus Krupp (1706–1757), owner of the Krupp merchant house, which she took over after his death. She traded in food, spices, textiles, cloth and porcelain between Germany, the Netherlands and Great Britain. She founded a snus factory and managed an iron works in the Ruhr in 1799-1807.

She has been referred to as the founder of the Krupp dynasty. Two mines and a street have been named after her.

References

18th-century German businesswomen
18th-century German businesspeople
19th-century German businesswomen
19th-century German businesspeople
1732 births
1812 deaths
German industrialists
Krupp family